The 1942–43 Serie C was the eighth edition of Serie C, the third highest league in the Italian football league system.

Legend

Girone A

Girone B

Girone C

Girone D

Girone E

Girone F

Girone G

Girone H

Girone I

Girone L

Girone M

Girone N

Final rounds

Girone A

Girone B

After the war
At the end of this season the championship was suspended due to World War II. After the war, the devastation left by the battles on the Gothic Line made travels from one side of the Apennines to the other very difficult. The championship was restarted in 1945 with a transitory season where northern and southern sides took part in nearly separated competitions. For these reasons, the championship composition was deeply changed.

Northern sides
All the sides that took part in the Final rounds were arbitrary promoted to 1945–46 Serie B-C with the exception of Varese that asked to take part to the regional leagues because its home stadium was destroyed by bombardment.
Other 22 sides were promoted by the FIGC considering final placing, financial situation, previous sport merits, geographical representation, and, last but not least, if they had suffered wrongs made by the Fascist regime.
Girone A: Treviso
Girone B: Ferrara (later renamed back SPAL), Mantova, Suzzara and Trento
Girone C: Como, Crema, Seregno and the reborn Pro Sesto, that later absorbed the clubs Falck Sesto San Giovanni and Giovani Calciatori Sestesi.
Girone D: Gallaratese, Legnano, Vigevano and Vogherese
Girone E: Casale, Cuneo and Pro Vercelli
Girone F: Manlio Cavagnaro Sestri (later renamed back Sestrese) and Dopolavoro/Ausonia Spezia
Girone G: Panigale, Piacenza and Reggiana
Girone H: Cesena
Istrian sides had to leave the league after annexation of the region by Yugoslavia. The teams from Rijeka/Fiume, Pula/Pola, and later Izola/Isola d'Istria were integrated in an Istrian tournament in 1945 and in the Yugoslav pyramid in 1946.
All the relegations obtained on the pitch were cancelled, let alone cases of financial difficulties or dissolution.

Southern sides
Salernitana, promoted to Serie B at the end of the season, was admitted directly to 1945–46 Serie A-B.
All the other teams were admitted to 1945–46 Serie C's Southern league, let alone sides with financial difficulties.
In 1946, for equity, even the survived Southern finalists of this championship were admitted to Serie B.

Serie C seasons
3
Italy